Helianthemum propinquum, formerly called Crocanthemum propinquum, common names low frostweed and low rockrose, is a perennial plant that is native to the United States.

Conservation status
It is listed as endangered in Connecticut, and as a species of special concern in Rhode Island and Tennessee.

References

Flora of the United States
dumosum
Taxa named by Eugene P. Bicknell